The men's team sabre was one of seven fencing events on the fencing at the 1932 Summer Olympics programme. It was the sixth appearance of the event. The competition was held from 10 August 1932 to 11 August 1932. 32 fencers from six nations competed. Each team could have a maximum of six fencers, with four participating in any given match. France and Cuba entered, but withdrew before competition.

The competition format continued the pool play round-robin from prior years. Each of the four fencers from one team would face each of the four from the other, for a total of 16 bouts per match (with bouts unnecessary to determining the match winner sometimes not being played). The team that won more bouts won the match. Matches not necessary to determining qualification were not played.

Rosters

Denmark
 Ivan Osiier
 Erik Kofoed-Hansen
 Aage Leidersdorff
 Axel Bloch

Hungary
 Attila Petschauer
 Ernő Nagy
 Gyula Glykais
 György Piller-Jekelfalussy
 Aladár Gerevich
 Endre Kabos

Italy
 Gustavo Marzi
 Giulio Gaudini
 Renato Anselmi
 Emilio Salafia
 Arturo De Vecchi
 Ugo Pignotti

Mexico
 Antonio Haro
 Francisco Valero
 Gerónimo Delgadillo
 Nicolás Reyero

Poland
 Tadeusz Friedrich
 Marian Suski
 Władysław Dobrowolski
 Władysław Segda
 Adam Papée
 Leszek Lubicz-Nycz

United States
 Peter Bruder
 John Huffman
 Norman Cohn-Armitage
 Nickolas Muray
 Harold Van Buskirk
 Ralph Faulkner

Results

Round 1

The top two teams in each pool advanced to the final. Cuba and France both withdrew, leaving the first pool with only two teams--automatically advancing both.

Pool 1

Pool 2

Final

References

Fencing at the 1932 Summer Olympics
Men's events at the 1932 Summer Olympics